Michael Andrew Nykoluk (December 11, 1934 – January 31, 2022) was a Canadian professional ice hockey player and coach.  He played 32 games in the National Hockey League (NHL) for the Toronto Maple Leafs in 1956–57.  The rest of his playing career, which lasted from 1955 to 1972, was spent in the minor leagues.  He became the first assistant coach in the NHL and won the Stanley Cup in that capacity with the Philadelphia Flyers in 1974 and 1975, before serving as the Maple Leafs head coach from 1981 to 1984.  He was the younger brother of longtime Canadian Football League player Danny Nykoluk.

Early life
Nykoluk was born in Toronto on December 11, 1934.  He played ice hockey and Canadian football when he was in high school.  He began his junior career in 1953–54 with the Toronto Marlboros of the Ontario Hockey Association.  He was part of the team that won the 1955 Memorial Cup, scoring 13 points in 10 games in the playoffs that year.

Playing career

Nykoluk began his professional career with the Rochester Americans of the American Hockey League (AHL) during their inaugural season in 1956–57.  In the middle of that season, he was called up to play in the National Hockey League (NHL) for the Toronto Maple Leafs.  The 32 games he played for Toronto, in which he scored four points, would be his only stint in the NHL.  He was sent back down to the Americans, and was subsequently traded with Ron Hurst to the Hershey Bears in exchange for Willie Marshall.

Nykoluk went on to have a 14-season career with the Bears.  The team won two Calder Cup during his career (1959 and 1969).  He led the league twice in assists, and amassed 50 or more assists in seven consecutive seasons (1963 to 1970).  He was named to AHL All-Star Second Team in 1967 and was conferred the Les Cunningham Award at the end of the year as the league's most valuable player.  Nykoluk proceeded to hit a career-high 19 goals and 85 points the following season and was consequently selected the AHL All-Star First Team.  He eventually retired from playing in 1972.

Nykoluk's number 8 was later retired by the Bears.  He was part of the second class inducted into the AHL Hall of Fame in 2007.  At the time of his death, he was the Bears' all-time leader in games played (972), assists (636), and points (808).  He was also third in the AHL all-time in assists (686), sixth in points (881), and fifth in games played (1,069).

Coaching career
After his playing career ended, Nykoluk was offered a job with the Philadelphia Flyers as an assistant to head coach Fred Shero.  He became the first full-time assistant coach in the NHL.  During his tenure, the Flyers won the Stanley Cup in 1974 and 1975.  He subsequently became an assistant to head coach Shero with the New York Rangers, and later served as head coach of the Toronto Maple Leafs for three seasons ending in 1984.

Personal life
Nykoluk was married to Dolly until his death.  They met at his sister's wedding, where she was a bridesmaid.  Together, they had four children.

After retiring from coaching hockey, Nykoluk and his wife relocated to Naples, Florida, around 1990.  He underwent a quadruple bypass surgery in April 2010.  Nykoluk died on January 31, 2022, at the age of 87.

Career statistics

Regular season and playoffs

Coaching record

Awards and achievements
 Memorial Cup champion (1955)
 Calder Cup (AHL) champion (1959 and 1969)
 AHL Second All-Star Team (1967)
 Les Cunningham Award (AHL) MVP (1967)
 AHL First All-Star Team (1968)
 Stanley Cup champion (1974, 1975; as an assistant coach)

References

External links
 
 AHL Hockey Hall of Fame bio

1934 births
2022 deaths
Canadian ice hockey centres
Canadian ice hockey coaches
Canadian people of Ukrainian descent
Hershey Bears players
National Hockey League broadcasters
New York Rangers coaches
Philadelphia Flyers coaches
Rochester Americans players
Ice hockey people from Toronto
Stanley Cup champions
Toronto Maple Leafs announcers
Toronto Maple Leafs coaches
Toronto Maple Leafs players
Toronto Marlboros players
Winnipeg Warriors (minor pro) players